Bughea de Jos is a commune in Argeș County, Muntenia, Romania. It is composed of a single village, Bughea de Jos.

The commune is situated on the banks of the river Bughea. The hamlet Valea Macelarului is situated on the left bank of the river Bratia.

References

Communes in Argeș County
Localities in Muntenia